Cymande (pronounced  ) is the debut album by British funk group Cymande. It was released in 1972 through Janus Records and produced entirely by John Schroeder. Recording sessions took place at De Lane Lea Studios in London.

The album peaked at No. 85 on the Billboard Top LPs and No. 24 on the Soul Albums in the United States. It spawned two singles, "The Message" and "Bra", both made it to the Soul Singles chart, reaching No. 22 and No. 51 respectively. Its lead single "The Message" also peaked at No. 48 on the Billboard Hot 100 singles chart.

Track listing

Personnel
Ray King – vocals, percussion
Peter Serreo – tenor saxophone
Michael "Bami" Rose – alto saxophone, flute, bongos
Pablo Gonsales – congas
Sam Kelly – drums
Joey Dee – vocals, percussion
Derek Gibbs – alto and soprano saxophone
Steve Scipio – bass
Patrick Eaton Patterson – guitar
John Schroeder – producer, liner notes
Mia Krinsky – coordinator

Charts

References

External links

Cymande albums
1972 debut albums
Janus Records albums
Albums produced by John Schroeder (musician)